Shivan Kandi (also Romanized as Shīvān Kandī; also known as Shīvā Kandī) is a village in Firuraq Rural District, in the Central District of Khoy County, West Azerbaijan Province, Iran. At the 2006 census, its population was 289, in 48 families.

References 

Populated places in Khoy County